Wilmer Clemons Hosket Sr. (February 19, 1911 – December 19, 1956) was an American basketball player and coach.

A 6'5" center, Hosket starred at Stivers High School in Dayton, Ohio, whom he led to three state championships from 1928 to 1930, and was named to the All-tournament team each time. He was an inaugural inductee of the school's Hall of Fame.

He then played at the Ohio State University, where he won a Big Ten Conference championship in 1933. He was named All-Big Ten center for the season. After college, Hosket played for a short time in the National Basketball League as a member of the Dayton Metropolitans.

Personal life
Hosket was married to Ethel, with whom he had three children, Diana Sue, Beverly Ann, and Bill Jr. Bill Jr. would also become a basketball player, following in his father's footsteps at Ohio State, before playing in the NBA for the New York Knicks and Buffalo Braves. Both Hoskets have been inducted into the Ohio State University Hall of Fame and the Ohio Basketball Hall of Fame. After his basketball career, Hosket Sr. worked for General Motors, and was as a basketball and football referee in the Dayton area. Hosket died of leukemia in 1956.

References

External links
 NBL stats
 Ohio Basketball Hall of Fame Profile

1911 births
1956 deaths
American men's basketball coaches
American men's basketball players
Basketball coaches from Ohio
Basketball players from Dayton, Ohio
Centers (basketball)
Dayton Metropolitans coaches
Dayton Metropolitans players
Ohio State Buckeyes men's basketball players
Player-coaches